Andrew Sartee (born 16 March 1949) is a Liberian sprinter. He competed in the men's 100 metres at the 1972 Summer Olympics.

References

1949 births
Living people
Athletes (track and field) at the 1972 Summer Olympics
Liberian male sprinters
Olympic athletes of Liberia
Place of birth missing (living people)